Northwest York Historic District is a national historic district located in the Northwest York neighborhood of York in York County, Pennsylvania.   The district includes 815 contributing buildings, 1 contributing site, and 1 contributing structure in a residential area of York.  The neighborhood was developed between 1882 and 1930, and includes notable vernacular examples of various Late Victorian styles, Colonial Revival, and American Foursquare.

It was listed on the National Register of Historic Places in 1983.

References 

York, Pennsylvania
Historic districts on the National Register of Historic Places in Pennsylvania
Victorian architecture in Pennsylvania
Historic districts in York County, Pennsylvania
National Register of Historic Places in York County, Pennsylvania